Nivruti Satwaji Kamble (born 14 April 1910) was an Indian politician. He was elected to the Lok Sabha, the lower house of the Parliament of India  as a member of the Republican Party of India.

References

External links
Official biographical sketch in Parliament of India website

1910 births
Possibly living people
India MPs 1971–1977
Lok Sabha members from Maharashtra